Yerma is a 1998 Spanish drama film directed and written  by Pilar Távora which stars Aitana Sánchez-Gijón, alongside Juan Diego and Irene Papas. It is an adaptation of the play of the same name by Federico García Lorca.

Plot 
A tragedy set in rural Andalusia, the plot follows the plight of a childless woman obsessed with the prospect of having offspring, torn between hopefulness and desperation.

Cast

Production 
The film was produced by Artimagen Producciones with the collaboration of Canal Sur Televisión and TVE. It was fully shot in Andalusia, in the provinces of Huelva and Seville.

Release 
The film screened at the 1998 San Sebastián Film Festival as well as in Puerto Rico and Chicago. It was domestically distributed by Columbia Tri-Star Films de España S.A. Despite the regional support from the Andalusian regional administration, the film did not fare well at the box office, grossing around 44 million ₧ (80,000 admissions) against a 250 million ₧ budget.

See also 
 List of Spanish films of 1999

References

Bibliography 
 
 
 

Films set in Andalusia
Films shot in the province of Huelva
Films shot in the province of Seville
1998 films
1998 drama films
1990s Spanish-language films
Spanish drama films
1990s Spanish films